Jack Riley (27 April 1927 – 28 May 2008) was an English cricketer. He appeared just once in first-class cricket, playing for Worcestershire against Cambridge University at Fenner's in May 1953, taking 3/25 in Cambridge's first innings. Among his victims was the university's captain Robin Marlar.

By far the largest part of Riley's career – more than 300 matches – was spent playing for Enfield in the Lancashire League between 1950 and 1968 and captaining them between 1956 and 1963, having previously played for Accrington.
In late August 1963 he took five wickets for just one run in 4.7 eight-ball overs against Ramsbottom.

Notes

References

English cricketers
Worcestershire cricketers
1927 births
2008 deaths
People from Accrington